Rap Jam: Volume One is a basketball video game for the Super Nintendo Entertainment System, developed by American studio 64WD Creation, in which the players are rap and hip-hop artists. The game is played on an urban basketball court, with fisticuffs and no foul calls. There is an exhibition mode and a tournament mode.

The game was released in January 1995. Despite the Volume One moniker, this was the only installment released. It is also the second and final game to be developed by Motown Software.

Characters
Coolio
House of Pain (Everlast, Danny Boy, & DJ Lethal)
LL Cool J
Naughty by Nature (Treach, Vin Rock, & Kay Gee)
Onyx (Sticky Fingaz, Fredro Starr, Big DS, & Suave)
Public Enemy (Flavor Flav, Chuck D, & Terminator X)
Queen Latifah
Warren G
Yo-Yo

Reception
In 1997 Electronic Gaming Monthly ranked it number 9 on their "Top 10 Worst Games of All Time". Electronic Gaming Monthlys Seanbaby placed it as number 14 in his "20 worst games of all time" feature.

References

External links
 Rap Jam listing on gamespot.com

1995 video games
Basketball video games
Video games based on musicians
North America-exclusive video games
Super Nintendo Entertainment System games
Super Nintendo Entertainment System-only games
Video games set in 1995
Multiplayer and single-player video games
Video games developed in the United States
Video games featuring black protagonists
Video games based on real people
Cultural depictions of hip hop musicians